Caumont-sur-Durance (literally Caumont on Durance) is a commune in the Vaucluse department in the Provence-Alpes-Côte d'Azur region of Southeastern France. In 2017, it had a population of 4,885.

Geography
The river Calavon flows into the Durance in the commune. It is home to the Charterhouse of Bonpas (French: Chartreuse de Bonpas), a former Carthusian priory and historic monument.

See also
Communes of the Vaucluse department
Avignon – Provence Airport

References

Communes of Vaucluse